The Good Daughter is a 2012 Philippine television drama series broadcast by GMA Network. Directed by Mike Tuviera, it stars Kylie Padilla in the title role. It premiered on February 13, 2012 on the network's Afternoon Prime line up replacing Ikaw Lang ang Mamahalin. The series concluded on June 1, 2012 with a total of 78 episodes. It was replaced by Kasalanan Bang Ibigin Ka? in its timeslot.

The series is streaming online on YouTube.

Cast and characters

Lead cast
 Kylie Padilla as Bea Emmanuel Atilano Guevarra

Supporting cast
 Rocco Nacino as Darwin Alejandro Reyes
 Alicia Mayer as Sharon Alejandro-Reyes
 Raymond Bagatsing as Rico Guevarra
 LJ Reyes as Francesca "Frances" Alejandro Reyes
 Max Collins as Ziri Claustro
 Luz Valdez as Lourdes Atilano
 Ervic Vijandre as Mario Escobar
 Dion Ignacio as Paul Noche
 Angeli Nicole Sanoy as Julia Alejandro Guevarra

Guest cast
 Glydel Mercado as Tina Atilano-Guevarra
 Lito Legaspi as Miguel Guevarra
 Chinggoy Alonzo as Manuel
 Daniella Amable as young Bea
 Jerould Aceron as young Darwin
 Joni Macnab as young Frances
 Maricel Morales as Chesca
 Kevin Santos as Arnold
 Froilan Sales as Alex
 Dionne de Guzman as Nania
 Charito Alvear as Fe
 Alvin Aragon as Mervin
 Benedict Campos as Hans

Ratings
According to AGB Nielsen Philippines' Mega Manila household television ratings, the pilot episode of The Good Daughter earned an 18.3% rating. While the final episode scored a 28.2% rating.

References

External links
 
 

2012 Philippine television series debuts
2012 Philippine television series endings
Filipino-language television shows
GMA Network drama series
Television shows set in the Philippines